WSSS can refer to:

West Spring Secondary School, a secondary school in Bukit Panjang, Singapore
the ICAO airport code for Singapore Changi Airport
WSSS-FM, a former radio station in Charlotte, North Carolina
WSSS-LP, a defunct low-powered television station (channel 25) formerly licensed to serve Steubenville, Ohio